Dingadee is a closed station on the Main North railway line in New South Wales.  It opened in 1913 and closed to passenger services in 1975. Little trace remains.

References 

Disused regional railway stations in New South Wales
Railway stations in the Hunter Region
Railway stations in Australia opened in 1913
Railway stations closed in 1975